NGC 2460 is an unbarred spiral galaxy in the constellation Camelopardalis. It was discovered by German astronomer Wilhelm Tempel on August 11, 1882.

It is also identified as an active nucleus galaxy. Its redshift of 0.004837 gives a distance of 22 megaparsecs, or approximately 70 million light-years.

Physical characteristics
NGC 2460 has an absolute magnitude of −21.0, and an apparent magnitude of 11.46. Several arms extend for long distances from the central galaxy, perhaps as a result of an interaction with nearby galaxy PGC 213434. The galaxy has a radial velocity of 1446 km/s.

References

External links 
 

2460
Unbarred spiral galaxies
Camelopardalis (constellation)
Discoveries by Wilhelm Tempel
022270